Marian Bogdan Cieplak  (9 January 1893, Tarnopol, Austrian Poland (now Ternopil, Ukraine)  - 19 July 1996 in Ocala, Florida, United States) was a Polish diplomat and statesman, recipient of many awards and decorations.

Member of the Sejm of 1, 2, 3, and 5 convocations of the Second Polish Republic.

Following World War II he lived in the US, where he performed various diplomatic functions for Poland and was active in American Polonia.

In 1991 he was pronounced honorary citizen of Turek.

References

1893 births
1996 deaths
Politicians from Ternopil
People from the Kingdom of Galicia and Lodomeria
Polish Austro-Hungarians
Polish People's Party "Piast" politicians
Stronnictwo Chłopskie politicians
Nonpartisan Bloc for Cooperation with the Government politicians
Members of the Sejm of the Second Polish Republic (1922–1927)
Members of the Sejm of the Second Polish Republic (1928–1930)
Members of the Sejm of the Second Polish Republic (1938–1939)
Diplomats of the Second Polish Republic
Men centenarians
Polish centenarians
Polish emigrants to the United States
Polish people of the Polish–Ukrainian War
Polish people of the Polish–Soviet War
Recipients of the Cross of Independence
Recipients of the Cross of Valour (Poland)